George Crowe (June 28, 1936 – January 6, 2019) was a Canadian ice hockey coach who spent nearly 40 years in the college and high school ranks. For 21 years, Crowe coached both the men's and women's programs at Dartmouth.

Career
George Crowe began his coaching career at the Albany Academy for Boys before moving into the college level to take over for the newly minted club team at Oswego State in 1964. The Great Lakers became a Division III in 1966, and while they had success early on, Crowe left the program after only three more years. He returned to coach high school hockey, this time at Phillips Exeter Academy. Six years on Crowe accepted a second coaching gig in the NCAA, this time with Dartmouth.

When Crowe arrived in Hanover, the Big Green hadn't made a tournament appearance in 26 years and had 15 losing seasons in that span. Crowe's arrival brought about immediate dividends when Dartmouth won 11 more games than the previous season and, after two middling years, the Big Green posted back-to-back 19-win seasons, making the tournament in both 1979 and 1980 (The team's last appearance as of 2016). Unfortunately, Dartmouth began losing soon thereafter once more ending up with sub-.500 records in each of the next four seasons, bottoming out with a 3-23 mark in 1983–84 (a team-worst record to that point). After the season, Crowe resigned to spend more time with his Elite Sports Camps.

After going through 3 separate head coaches over the previous three seasons, the women's team at Dartmouth was looking for yet another bench boss and turned to Crowe to stabilize the program. The choice was soon proven to be a correct one as Crowe led the Big Green to winning seasons in each of the twelve years with the women's team. In that time, Dartmouth won four Ivy League titles and became a perennial power. Crowe retired from coaching for good following the 1997–98 season, turning the team over to Judy Oberting

He died on January 6, 2019, at the age of 82.

Head coaching record

References

External links

1936 births
2019 deaths
Canadian ice hockey coaches
Dartmouth Big Green men's ice hockey coaches
Dartmouth Big Green women's ice hockey coaches
People from Kings County, New Brunswick
Ice hockey people from New Brunswick